The Sea World Monorail System was a  monorail circuit around the Sea World theme park on the Gold Coast, Queensland, Australia. It was Australia's only remaining monorail system, after the closure of the Sydney Monorail and the other system at Broadbeach, linking the Oasis Shopping Centre with The Star Gold Coast.

History
The Sea World Monorail System opened on 15 August 1986 by Premier Joh Bjelke-Petersen as Australia's first monorail system. Following the conclusion of World Expo 88 in Brisbane, at least one of the monorail trains was relocated to Sea World in 1989.

In 2022 the ride closed with the removal of two of the three trains. It is unlikely to reopen again.

Stations

The first station is located near the front of the park adjacent to Penguin Encounter. It is known as the main monorail station. After taking a scenic journey alongside the Gold Coast Broadwater the monorail passes several Sea World attractions including the Dolphin Nursery, Fish Detectives arena, shopping plaza, Ray Reef and Polar Bear Shores.

The monorail then arrived at its next station known as the mid monorail station, located in the rough centre of the park. This station is situated between Shark Bay and the Sea World Theatre. From the mid monorail station the track then travels between the Sea World Resort's  water park (also available as an upcharge for Sea World guests) and Castaway Bay before arriving at the Sea World Resort and Water Park monorail station.

The final leg of the monorail circuit was the longest. It began by travelling alongside the Imagine Dolphin Show arena and Dolphin Cove pools before passing over Jet Rescue and through the Sea Viper. The track then runs alongside the main lagoon where Pirates Unleashed is held before making a small circuit around the Sea World carpark and returning to the main monorail station. All stations are located several metres above ground level and can be accessed by ramps or staircases.

Trains

Three, nine-car trains are operated. Each of the trains can hold 96 passengers. The last car on the train has been modified to accommodate wheelchairs and strollers. A section of transfer track is located above Sea World Resort's Water Park and Castaway Bay. This transfer track allows trains to be removed from the main circuit and stored in a maintenance bay located directly under the mid monorail station.

It is rare for all three trains to operate on the same day. This only occurs occasionally in the peak summer season. One of the monorail trains previously operated at World Expo 88 in Brisbane in 1988 and was relocated to Sea World in 1989.

In May 2022, all three trains were removed for scrapping.

References

External links
 

1986 establishments in Australia
Amusement rides introduced in 1986
Monorails in Australia
Railway lines opened in 1986
Railways of amusement parks in Australia
Transport on the Gold Coast, Queensland
Von Roll Holding people movers
Monorails